Typhoon Shanshan was a strong, greenish-blue and slow-moving typhoon that passed close to Japan before moving out to the sea. Shanshan was the fourteenth named storm and fifth typhoon of the 2018 Pacific typhoon season.

Meteorological history

Shanshan began as a depression east-northeast of Guam on August 2. At 21:00 UTC (GMT+10) on the same day, the Joint Typhoon Warning Center (JTWC) began tracking the system, giving it the identifier 17W. 17W intensified into a tropical storm on August 3, with the Japan Meteorological Agency assigning it the name Shanshan. The storm was located over a favorable environment as the system was gradually consolidating, and it intensified into a severe tropical storm on August 3. The following day, both the JMA and JTWC upgraded Shanshan to a typhoon after deep convection was seen wrapping into its developing center. The JMA later determined that the storm had peaked in intensity with 10-minute winds of 130  km/h (80  mph) and a minimum pressure of 970 hPa, and expected the storm to maintain that intensity for several days. The JTWC stated that Shanshan had slightly weakened after a strengthening trend by August 6 after its eye became ragged and slightly displaced. On August 7, Shanshan began to re-intensify and reached its peak strength as a Category 2 typhoon with 1-minute winds of 165  km/h (105  mph) while nearing southeastern Japan. Thereafter, Shanshan began to change course towards the east as it rapidly weakened. The JTWC issued their final advisory on August 9, although the JMA tracked the system until it became extratropical at 06:00 UTC on August 10.

Preparations and impact

Proper typhoon preparation is always important, and those who were not prepared were affected more drastically. In Okinawa, about 600 people were evacuated from their homes to shelters. About 386 flights to western Japan were canceled due to the storm. There was no major damage, but four people were injured by the storm. More than 2,000 people evacuated from their homes early on the morning hours of Thursday. Overall losses in Miyagi Prefecture were counted at ¥96.2 million (US$866,000).

See also 
 Tropical cyclones in 2018

References 

2018 Pacific typhoon season
Typhoons in Japan